The Violators is a 1957 American crime film directed by John Newland, written by Ernest Pendrell, and starring Arthur O'Connell, Nancy Malone, Fred Beir, Clarice Blackburn and Henry Sharp. It was released on November 27, 1957, RKO Pictures.

Plot

A probation officer who is known for his sympathetic attitude towards juvenile delinquents is confronted with a personal conflict when his daughter falls in love with a boy who is himself in trouble with the law.

Cast 
Arthur O'Connell as Solomon Baumgarden
Nancy Malone as Debbie Baumgarden
Fred Beir as Jimmy Coogan
Clarice Blackburn as Eva Baumgarden
Henry Sharp as David Baumgarden
Mary Michael as Mrs. Riley
Joseph Julian as Mr. Riley
Bill Darrid as Anthony Calini
Sheila Copelan as Sharon Riley
Bernard Lenrow as Judge McKenna
Martin Freed as Barnie
Mercer McLeod as Judge Blatz
Eva Steen as Jean
Norman Rose as Stephen
Maxine Stewart as Salesgirl
Margaret Draper as Molly Coogan Casey
Frank Maxwell as Sam
John McGovern as Mr. Coogan
Norman Fell as Ray 
Tom Middleton as Ralph

References

External links 
 

1957 films
American black-and-white films
RKO Pictures films
1957 crime films
American crime films
1950s English-language films
1950s American films
English-language crime films